Sphenoclea zeylanica, called chickenspike, gooseweed, and wedgewort, is a widespread species of flowering plant in the genus Sphenoclea, native to Africa, Madagascar, tropical and subtropical Asia, and Australia. It is widely introduced in the New World tropics and subtopics from the southern United States to northern Argentina. Its young leaves are edible and are occasionally eaten, perhaps with a light boiling. A common weed of rice paddies, it can cause yield losses from 25 to 50%.

References

Solanales
Plants described in 1788